Sussex is an unincorporated community in Johnson County, Wyoming, United States.

References

Unincorporated communities in Wyoming
Unincorporated communities in Johnson County, Wyoming